J. Spencer Fluhman is a professor of history at Brigham Young University (BYU) in Provo, Utah.

Fluhman received a bachelor's degree from BYU and a master's degree from the University of Wisconsin–Madison. Fluhman also has a Ph.D. in American religious history from the University of Wisconsin–Madison. His doctoral dissertation was on 19th-century anti-Mormon literature. As a graduate student, Fluhman was part of a summer seminar on Mormon History at BYU run by Richard Bushman. Fluhman has held a fellowship at the Center for the Study of Religion and American Culture at IUPUI.

Fluhman is a member of the Church of Jesus Christ of Latter-day Saints. He served as a missionary in the church's Washington D.C. South Mission, which covered the Virginia suburbs of Washington and included the eastern panhandle of West Virginia.

At BYU, Fluhman has taught in both the History Department and the Department of Church History and Doctrine.

In 2013, his book "A Peculiar People": Anti-Mormonism and the Making of Religion in Nineteenth-Century America won the Mormon History Association's Best First Book Award.

On May 4, 2016, BYU announced that Fluhman had been appointed executive director of the Neal A. Maxwell Institute for Religious Scholarship. As of late 2016 Fluhman was the co-chair of the Mormon Studies Group in the American Academy of Religion.

Publications
Books

The Doctrine and Covenants: Revelations in Context (with Andrew H. Hedges and Alonzo Gaskill)

Journal articles

Notes

Sources
BYU bio of Fluhman
Amazon.com entry on Fluhman
SpencerFluhman.com

American historians of religion
American male non-fiction writers
Latter Day Saints from Wisconsin
American Mormon missionaries in the United States
20th-century Mormon missionaries
Brigham Young University alumni
Brigham Young University faculty
Living people
Maxwell Institute people
University of Wisconsin–Madison alumni
Editors of Latter Day Saint publications
Historians of the Latter Day Saint movement
Latter Day Saints from Utah
Year of birth missing (living people)